Gil Chalan (also Romanized as Gīl Chālān; also known as Gīlchālān-e Bālā) is a village in Gil Dulab Rural District, in the Central District of Rezvanshahr County, Gilan Province, Iran. At the 2006 census, its population was 861, in 217 families.

References 

Populated places in Rezvanshahr County